This Is Elodie is the third studio album by Italian singer Elodie, released by Island Records on 31 January 2020. It features collaborations with Gemitaiz, Marracash, Fabri Fibra, Margherita Vicario, Ernia, Michele Bravi, Gué Pequeno, Ghemon and The Kolors.

The album debuted at number six on the FIMI Albums Chart and was certified platinum in Italy. It was the best-selling female album of 2020 in Italy.

Background
The project was realized between 2018 and 2019, during which Elodie recorded over seventy songs, selecting sixteen, composed by forty-five songwriters and seventeen producers like Dardust, Mahmood, Max Brigante, Jacopo Pesce, Neffa, Marracash, Levante and Takagi & Ketra. The album moves on various musical genres, from pop to hip hop to reggaeton, soul and urban. During an interview, the singer described the album as if it was her first musical project: "I worked at three hundred and sixty degrees, from the choice of sound to that of the lyrics, because I wanted them to speak like me in a raw, direct way.  [...] It was my dream, the way I imagined myself, ever since I started. I met the songwriters, I told them about me, to find something that fits my personality".

Promotion 
The album was anticipated by some collaborations released between 2018 and 2019, including "Nero Bali" with Michele Bravi and Gué Pequeno and "Margarita" with Marracash; both were certified double platinum. The album also includes "Pensare male", recorded with The Kolors and certified platinum.

In January 2020 "Non è la fine" with Gemitaiz and "Mal di testa" with Fabri Fibra were released. Elodie participated with "Andromeda" at the Sanremo Music Festival 2020, a choice made by the singer and the record label in order to "break certain schemes of the Italian discography, which is sometimes a bit too lazy". The single later peaked at number six on the FIMI Singles Chart, being certified platinum.

On 13 May 2020 "Guaranà" was released as the eighth single and was included on the streaming reissue of the album, receiving a double disc of platinum.

Critical reception 

Writing for All Music Italia, Fabio Fiume opined that "This Is Elodie" is "a well-finished, complete album, son of the times but with several songs that won't be old tomorrow".

Track listing

Charts

Weekly charts

Year-end charts

Certifications

References

2020 albums
Elodie (singer) albums